Petsofas is the archaeological site of a Minoan peak sanctuary in eastern Crete. It overlooks the Minoan town of  Palaikastro and was excavated by John Myres in 1903. He discovered a large number of clay figurines, including animal and human figures dating to 1400 to 1450.

Archaeology
Among the ubiquitous human and animal figurines found in peak sanctuaries, Petsofas uniquely has clay figurines of weasels and tortoises. Some Petsophas cylinder seals bear a male figure resembling specimens recovered at the Minoan site of Knossos.  Stone lamps, ceramic altars and ceramic building models have also been found at Petsofas.

See also
Lato

References

External links

1903 archaeological discoveries
Peak sanctuaries